William Ross (born 4 February 1936) is a Unionist politician in Northern Ireland who is the President of the Traditional Unionist Voice (TUV). He served as the Ulster Unionist Party (UUP) Member of Parliament (MP) for Londonderry (later East Londonderry) from February 1974 until 2001. He was one of the UUP members opposed to the Good Friday Agreement.

For some years he was a member of the Conservative Monday Club (which followed the Tory tradition of being Conservative and Unionist). In September 1982 he was chairman of the club's Northern Ireland Committee when it published a Policy Paper entitled  Proposals for a Constitutional Settlement [for Ulster].

As Chief Whip of the Ulster Unionist Parliamentary Party from 1987 to 1995, in an attempt to derail multi-party talks initiated by Peter Brooke (the then Secretary of State for Northern Ireland), in February 1990 Ross unsuccessfully introduced a Private Member's Bill, the Northern Ireland Act 1974 (Amendment) Bill, to provide that laws for Northern Ireland may not be made by (non-amendable) Orders-in-Council but by (amendable)  Bill introduced into the United Kingdom Parliament, and repeatedly called on the then Conservative Government to implement its 1979 Conservative General Election Manifesto commitment to "establish one or more elected regional councils with a wide range of powers over local services" (in Northern Ireland), which had been drafted by the then UUP Leader Jim Molyneaux and adopted by the late Airey Neave (then Shadow Secretary of State for Northern Ireland) in 1978.

Following Jim (later Lord) Molyneaux's retirement as UUP Leader, Ross unsuccessfully stood for the leadership of the Ulster Unionist Party in September 1995 and, although a close confidant and supporter of Molyneaux throughout the latter's leadership of the UUP, quickly became a very vocal opponent of the policies and style of newly elected UUP Leader David Trimble.

In June 2008, it was announced that he had been made the party president of Traditional Unionist Voice (TUV).

William Ross stood for the TUV in the 2010 UK General Election in the East Londonderry Constituency.

References

External links 
 

1936 births
Living people
Members of the Parliament of the United Kingdom for County Londonderry constituencies (since 1922)
Ulster Unionist Party members of the House of Commons of the United Kingdom
Anglicans from Northern Ireland
Traditional Unionist Voice politicians
UK MPs 1974
UK MPs 1974–1979
UK MPs 1979–1983
UK MPs 1983–1987
UK MPs 1987–1992
UK MPs 1992–1997
UK MPs 1997–2001